Emma Rose Kelly is an English footballer who plays as a midfielder for Sunderland in the Second-division FA Women's Championship. She previously played for Sunderland, Middlesbrough and Icelandic club ÍBV. She has represented England on the under-19 and under-17 national teams.

Club career

Sunderland
In 2014, Kelly played for Sunderland in the inaugural season of the FA WSL 2 and helped them clinch league title, resulting in promotion to the top-level FA WSL the following season.

ÍB Vestmannaeyja
In 2019, Kelly signed with ÍB Vestmannaeyjar (ÍBV) in Iceland's top-division Úrvalsdeild kvenna. She scored three goals and was named the club's player of the year.

Birmingham City
In January 2020, Kelly returned to England to sign with FA WSL club Birmingham City. She made her debut for the team on 19 January 2020 as a substitute in a 2–0 defeat to Manchester City.

International
Kelly has represented England on the under-19 and under-17 national teams. She was called to training camp for the under-21 national team.

Honors

Club
Sunderland
FA WSL 2: 2014

References

External links

Birmingham City player profile

Living people
English women's footballers
Sunderland A.F.C. Ladies players
Middlesbrough W.F.C. players
Birmingham City W.F.C. players
Women's Super League players
Emma Kelly
Expatriate women's footballers in Iceland
English expatriate sportspeople in Iceland
Emma Kelly
1997 births
Women's association football midfielders
Women's association football forwards